Edwin Joseph Bocage (September 20, 1930 – March 18, 2009), known as Eddie Bo, was an American  singer and pianist from New Orleans.  Schooled in jazz, he was known for his blues, soul and funk recordings, compositions, productions and arrangements.  He debuted on Ace Records in 1955 and released more single records than anyone else in New Orleans other than Fats Domino.

Eddie Bo worked and recorded for more than 40 different record labels, including Ace, Apollo Records, Arrow, At Last, Blue-Jay, Bo-Sound, Checker, Chess, Cinderella, Nola, Ric (for which business his carpentry skills were used to build a studio), Scram, Seven B, and Swan.  He is described at Allmusic as "a sorely underappreciated veteran of the New Orleans R&B scene."

Biography

Early life
Eddie Bo grew up in Algiers, Louisiana and in the Ninth Ward of New Orleans.  He came from a long line of ship builders with the male members of his family being bricklayers, carpenters and masons by day and musicians by night.  Eddie's mother was a self-taught pianist in the style of friend, Professor Longhair.  The Bocage family was involved in the traditional jazz community with cousins Charles, Henry and Peter, who played with  Sidney Bechet, contributing to jazz orchestras before World War II.

Eddie graduated from Booker T. Washington High School before going into the army.  After his army stint, he returned to New Orleans to study at the Grunewald School of Music.  There he learned piano, music theory and to sight read, and arrange music.  It was at this time that he was influenced by Russian classical pianist Vladimir Horowitz and was introduced to jazz pianists Art Tatum and Oscar Peterson.   He began playing in the New Orleans jazz scene, but made a switch to R&B after deciding it was more popular and brought in more money.  Like a lot of other local musicians Eddie frequented the premier blues venue in town, the Dew Drop Inn on LaSalle Street.  He played at the Club Tijuana under the name of Spider Bocage, later forming the Spider Bocage Orchestra, which toured the country supporting singers Big Joe Turner, Earl King, Guitar Slim, Johnny Adams, Lloyd Price, Ruth Brown, Smiley Lewis, and The Platters.

Recording and production career
His first released record in 1955 was "Baby", recorded for Johnny Vincent's Ace Records.  His next release, in 1956 on Apollo Records, was "I'm Wise" which Little Richard later recorded as "Slippin' and Slidin'".  After several releases on Ace he recorded "My Dearest Darling" in 1957 for Chess Records; the song, co-written by Bo and Paul Gayten, became a national chart hit in 1960 when recorded by Etta James.  From 1959, he recorded for Ric Records, and had regional hits including "Every Dog Has Its Day" and "Tell It Like It Is", and in 1961 recorded the novelty dance song "Check Mr Popeye", reissued nationally by Swan Records, which became one of his best-known recordings though not a national hit.

During the 1960s, Bo continued to release singles on a string of local record labels, including Rip, Cinderella, and Blue Jay, though only a few achieved national distribution.<ref name=kinda>[http://www.soulfulkindamusic.net/ebo.htm  Eddie Bo Discography, Soulful Kinda Music..]. Retrieved 27 July 2015</ref>  On these records, his style got funkier, and he used more of his jazz training, helping to create a distinctively different and influential New Orleans piano style. He recorded the renowned "Pass The Hatchet" under the nom de disque, Roger and the Gypsies for Joe Banashak's Seven B label as well as "Fence of Love" and "SGB" (Stone Graveyard Business) under his own name.  He either wrote or produced most of the titles on Seven B records.    He also worked as a record producer, with musicians including Irma Thomas, Chris Kenner, Johnny Adams. Al "Carnival Time" Johnson, Art Neville, Chuck Carbo, Mary Jane Hooper, Robert Parker, and The Explosions.  In 1969, at the height of funk, he had his only national chart hit,  "Hook and Sling, Pts. 1 & 2", which reached number 13 on the Billboard R&B chart and number 73 on the pop chart. The song, on the Scram label, was recorded in just one take.  He then formed his own label, Bo-Sound, and had another regional hit with "Check Your Bucket".

From the early 1970s Bo worked in the music business only sporadically, after setting up his own renovation business.  In 1977 he released two albums, The Other Side of Eddie Bo and Watch for the Coming, which he produced himself.  In the late 1980s and 1990s he recorded with the Dirty Dozen Brass Band, with whom he toured Europe, and resurrected his Bo-Sound label. He joined Willy DeVille to play on two DeVille records, Victory Mixture and Big Easy Fantasy, and he toured with DeVille as well. He later joined up with Raful Neal and Rockin' Tabby Thomas playing and recording under the names The Louisiana Legends, The District Court and The Hoodoo Kings.  He continued to perform frequently in New Orleans and at festivals elsewhere, and toured intermittently.  He also bought a doctor's office and salon on Banks Street which he and his manager converted into an eatery for fans called "Check Your Bucket" after his 1970 hit.  Like his home and recording studio it was hit by Hurricane Katrina while Bo was on tour in Paris.  Due to Bo's carpentry and bricklaying skills he took on the task of completing the hurricane damage repairs himself.

Death and aftermath
Eddie Bo died on March 18, 2009, in Picayune, Mississippi, United States, of a heart attack, aged 78.   After his death, his body was cremated on the instructions of a woman claiming to be his sister, though other close relatives of Bo have subsequently claimed that she was unrelated to him.

A memorial concert was held in his memory on April 1, 2009, with guests including Dr. John, Irma Thomas and Allen Toussaint.

Family
Eddie Bo was survived by two sisters; Gloria Bocage-Sylva, who lives in Oakland, California, and Lisa Bocage-Howard, and two brothers; Oliver and Cornelius; plus eleven children: Valeri Ann Bocage, Edwin Joseph Bocage, Jr., Owen David Bocage, Nancy Marie Bocage-Siegel, Cheryl Bocage-Joseph, Tanya Bocage-Sales, Sonjia Bocage-Anderson, Tomekia Bocage-Jones and Ava Nicol.

Awards and recognitions
He won many music awards including two Lifetime Achievement awards from the South Louisiana Music Association and Music/Offbeat Best of the Beat.  His song "Hook & Sling" was featured on the breakbeat compilation Ultimate Breaks and Beats.  May 22, 1997 was declared "Eddie Bo Day" in New Orleans by mayor Marc Morial while Bo was playing in Karachi, Pakistan. Bo was also named New Orleans' music ambassador to Pakistan.

Discography

Singles
 1955: "Baby" / "So Glad" (Ace)
 1955: "We Like Mambo" / "I'm So Tired" (Ace)
 1956: "I'm Wise" / "Happy Tears" (Apollo)
 1956: "Please Forgive Me" / "I'll Be Satisfied" (Apollo)
 1956: "My Heart Was Meant For You" / "I Cry Oh" (Apollo)
 1956: "Tell Me Why" / "Hey Bo" (Instrumental) (Apollo)
 1956: "Too Much Of A Good Thing" / "Dearest One" (Apollo)
 1956: "Tell Me Why" / "Hey Bo" (Apollo)
 1957: "Indeed I Do" / "Every Day and Every Night" (Checker)
 1957: "Oh Oh" / "My Dearest Darling" (Chess)
 1958: "I'll Keep On Trying" / "I Love to Rock and Roll" (Ace)
 1958: "Walk That Walk" / "Hep Hep Hooray" (Chess)
 1959: "I Need Someone" / "Hey There Baby" (Ric)
 1959: "You Got Your Mojo Working" / "Everybody Knows" (Ric)
 1960: "Tell It Like It Is" / "Every Dog Got His Day" (Ric)
 1960: "Ain't It the Truth Now" / "Warm Daddy" (Ric)
 1960: "It Must Be Love" / "What a Fool I've Been (Ric)
 1961: "Dinky Doo" / "Everybody, Everything Needs Love" (Ric)
 1961: "Dinky Doo" / "Everybody, Everything Needs Love" (Capitol)
 1962: "Bless Us All" / "When You Cry Your Heart Out" (Rip)
 1962: "Mo-Jo" / "Let's Limbo" (Rip)
 1962: "You're The Only One" / "You're With Me" (Rip)
 1962: "You're The Only One" / "You're With Me" (Chess) 
 1962: "I Just Keep Rolling" (Rip)
 1962: "I Got To Know" / "Bless You Darling" (Ric)
 1962: "Check Mr. Popeye (Part 1)" / "Now Let's Popeye (Part 2)" (Swan)
 1962: "Baby I'm Wise" / "Roamin - Titis" (Ric)
 1963: "Woman" / "Temptation" (Rip)
 1963: "Tee Na Na" / "Mama Said" (Rip)
 1963: "Te Na Na Nay" / "Twinkle Toes" (At Last)
 1963: "I Found A Little Girl" / "Hold Me" (At Last)
 1963: "Reassure Me" / "Shake Rattle And Roll" (Cinderella)
 1963: "Just Like a Monkey" / "Have Mercy on Me" (Cinderella)
 1964: "Fare Thee Well" / "Let's Do It" (Arrow)
 1964: "Fare Thee Well" / "Let's Do It" (Chess)
 1964: "You Are Going To Be Somebody's Fool" / "A Heap See (But A Few Know)" (Nola)
 1964: "Gotta Have More" / "Come With Me" (Blue Jay)
 1964: "Fight It" / "The River of Tears" (Blue Jay)
 1964: "Fee-Fie-Jum-Bo-Li" / "Danger" (Blue Jay)
 1965: "Our Love (Will Never Falter)" / "Lucky In Love" (Blue Jay)
 1966: "Ooh Wee Baby What You Gonna Do" / "Fallin' In Love Again" (Seven B)
 1966: "Let Our Love Begin" / "From This Day On" (Seven B)
 1967: "Just Friends" / "Fence Of Love" (Seven B)
 1967: "All I Ask Of You" / "Skate It Out" (Seven B)
 1967: "Stone Graveyard Business" / "Solid Foundation" (Seven B)
 1968: "Lover And A Friend" / "If I Had To Do It Over" (Seven B)
 1969: "That Certain Someone" / "Love Has Been Good" (Scram)
 1969: "Hook And Sling (Parts 1 & 2)" (Scram)
 1969: "If It's Good For You (It's Good For You) (Parts 1 & 2)" (Scram)
 1970: "The Rubber Band (Parts 1 & 2)" (Knight)
 1970: "Check Your Bucket" (Bo-Sound)

Albums
{| class="wikitable sortable"
|-
! Year of release
! Title
! Record label
|-
| 1977
| The Other Side of Eddie Bo| Bo-Sound
|-
| 1979
| Another Side of Eddie Bo| Bo-Sound
|-
| 1984
| Watch For The Coming| Bo-Sound
|-
| 1988
| Vippin and Vopiin' '| Charly
|-
| 1988
| Check Mr. Popeye| Rounder
|-
| 1992
| Brink Of A New Day| Eboville
|-
| 1993
| New Orleans Piano Riffs for DJs| Tuff City
|-
| 1995
| New Orleans Solo Piano| Night Train
|-
| 1995
| Eddie Bo and Friends| Bo-Sound
|-
| 1995
| New Orleans Solo Piano| Night Train International
|-
| 1996
| Back Up This Train| 
|-
| 1996
| Oo La La, Mardi Gras| Bo-Sound
|-
| 1997
| The Hook and Sling| Funky Delicacies
|-
| 1997
| Shoot From The Root| Soulciety
|-
| 1997
| The Best of Eddie Bo| Hubbub
|-
| 1998
| Hole In It| Soulciety
|-
| 1998
| Nine Yards of Funk| Bo-Sound
|-
| 2001
| We Come To Party| Bo-Sound
|-
| 2007
| Saints, Let's Go Marching On In| Bo-Sound
|-
| 2008
| In the Pocket With Eddie Bo| Vampi Soul
|-
| 2015
| Baby I'm Wise: The Complete Ric Singles 1959-1962| Ace
|-
|2016
|The 1991 Seasaint Sessions| Last Music Co.
|}

Filmography
 2006: New Orleans Music in Exile''

References

External links
 Official website
 Annotated Eddie Bo Discography
 [ Biography on Allmusic]

1930 births
2009 deaths
Ace Records (United States) artists
20th-century African-American male singers
American rhythm and blues singers
American soul musicians
Chess Records artists
Rhythm and blues musicians from New Orleans
Singers from Louisiana